Mohammed Mohib Ullah was a Rohingya human rights activist and leader, who, at the age of 46, was shot to death by an unidentified group of armed men on 29 September 2021, in his office at the world's largest refugee camp, Kutupalong refugee camp, in Ukhia Upazila, Cox's Bazar District, Bangladesh. He was chair of the Arakan Rohingya Society for Peace and Human Rights.

Numerous international organizations and states, including the U.N. and United States condemned the killing of Mohibullah, and demanded a transparent and thorough investigation of his murder.

The Bangladesh Police stated in March 2022 that he had been murdered by the Arakan Rohingya Salvation Army who saw his increasing popularity as a threat.

An investigative report submitted to a court in Cox's Bazar in June 2022 accused ARSA's leader Ataullah abu Ammar Jununi of ordering the murder because he feared Mohib Ullah and his organization Arakan Rohingya Society for Peace and Human Rights's popularity, which he believed could be an impediment in ARSA's operations. The police also stated that he had told Mohib Ullah to shut down the operations of his organization and join ARSA, but he refused. Meanwhile the Bangladesh Police had arrested fifteen out of 29 suspects it had accused of being involved in the murder.

References 

2021 in Bangladesh
2021 murders in Bangladesh
Cox's Bazar District
September 2021 crimes in Asia
September 2021 events in Asia
Refugees in Bangladesh